Bahrain fielded nine competitors at the 2009 World Championships in Athletics in Berlin, winning gold medals in the men's and women's 1500 meter events, and bronze in the men's 800 metres event, to finish 11th on the medal tally table.

Team selection

Track and road events

Field and combined events

Results

Men
Track and road events

Field and combined events

Women
Track and road events

References

External links
Official competition website

Nations at the 2009 World Championships in Athletics
World Championships in Athletics
Bahrain at the World Championships in Athletics